The Boston University Terriers represented Boston University in Women's Hockey East Association during the 2015–16 NCAA Division I women's ice hockey season.  The Terriers, defending WHEA Champions, finished 23-14-2 overall, and 17-5-2 in WHEA play.

Offseason
July 16: Three current members of the Terriers roster, Victoria Bach, Sarah Lefort and Rebecca Leslie were invited to the Canadian U22 camp.  Maddie Elia was invited to the USA Hockey Women’s National Festival in Lake Placid, New York. Both camps were used to determine rosters for a three-game series involving the Canadian and US Under-22 teams from August 19–22 in Lake Placid, New York.

Recruiting

Roster

2015-16 Terriers

Schedule

|-
!colspan=12 style=""| Regular Season

|-
!colspan=12 style=""| WHEA Tournament

Awards and honors

 Victoria Bach, Forward -  Hockey East Second Team WHEA All-Stars 
 Rebecca Leslie, Forward -  Hockey East Second Team WHEA All-Stars 
 Alexis Crossley, Defender -  Hockey East WHEA All-Star Honorable Mention 
 Sammy Davis, Forward - Hockey East All-Rookie Team

References

Boston University
Boston University Terriers women's ice hockey seasons